Rich Family is a Russian children's retailer headquartered in Novosibirsk. It was founded in 2002. Chain stores operate in Russia and Kazakhstan.

History 
The company was founded in 2002 in Novosibirsk.

On September 20, 2019, the company opened a hypermarket in Moscow.

Locations 
The company's hypermarkets are located in large cities from the Russian Far East to the Volga Region and also in Kazakhstan (Almaty).

Hypermarkets 
The average area of hypermarkets is 3.8 thousand m². The area of the hypermarket on Mochischenskoye Highway in Novosibirsk is 4.7 thousand m².

Finance

Revenue
In 2017, the company took 5th place in revenue among the largest Russian children's retailers after the Detsky Mir, Dochki & Synochki, Korablik and Mothercare.

Revenue from 2012 to 2017
 2012 — 2,11 billions ₽
 2013 — 3,57 billions ₽
 2014 — 5,43 billions ₽
 2015 — 7,4 billions ₽
 2016 — 8,9 billions ₽
 2017 — 10,7 billions ₽

Net profit
In 2017, the company's net profit amounted to 1.8 billion rubles.

Ratings
In 2016, Rich Family entered the RBC rating of "50 fastest growing companies in Russia", taking 49th position. In 2017, in the same rating, the company took 35th place.

References

Companies based in Novosibirsk
Toy companies of Russia
Retail companies established in 2002